The enzyme gluconate dehydratase catalyzes the chemical reaction

D-gluconate  2-dehydro-3-deoxy-D-gluconate + H2O

This enzyme belongs to the family of lyases, specifically the hydro-lyases, which cleave carbon-oxygen bonds.  The systematic name of this enzyme class is D-gluconate hydro-lyase (2-dehydro-3-deoxy-D-gluconate-forming). Other names in common use include D-gluconate dehydratase, and D-gluconate hydro-lyase.  This enzyme participates in the pentose phosphate pathway.

Structural studies

As of late 2007, only one structure has been solved for this class of enzymes, with the PDB accession code .

References

 

EC 4.2.1
Enzymes of known structure